Liushahe is a town  in Ningxiang, Hunan, China. It is surrounded by Qingshanqiao Town on the west, Huangcai Town and Shatian Township on the north, Laoliangcang Town and Huitang Town on the east, and Fanjiang Town on the south.

Administrative division

The town is divided into 11 villages and two communities: 
 Liushahe Community
 Helin Community
 Caochong
 Fuchong
 Hexing
 Waziping
 Datianfang
 Malian
 Hualin
 Fusifeng
 Hongshi
 Hongfu
 Chiduan

History
On January 7, 2021, a group of villagers from Hualin Village, found an underground cellar below a pond and discovered 20,000 ancient coins (more than 100 kilograms) inside as they were removing sludge from the bottom of the pool during repair work. Most of ancient coins date back to the Northern Song dynasty (960–1127).

Geography
The town has three reservoirs: Qiguan Reservoir, Meihua Reservoir and Tuanshan Reservoir.

Chu River is known as "Liushahe", a tributary of the Wei River, it flows through the town.

The Fusi Mountain is a scenic spot in the town.

Economy
The mountains in the town contains a rich supply of granite.

Citrus, peach, prunus mume and tobacco are important to the economy.

Education

There is one senior high school located with the town limits: Ningxiang No. 7 High School. Public junior high schools in the town include the Liushahe Junior High School.

Culture
Huaguxi is the most influence local theater.

Transportation

Provincial Highway 
Major highways that connect Liushahe Town to the rest of Hunan Province include the S209, which runs south through Qingshanqiao Town to Hutian Town and north to Laoliangcang Town.

County Road
The County Road X210 runs northwest to Shatian Township.

Expressway 
The Yiyang-Loudi-Hengyang Expressway in Hunan Province leads to Loudi City, Yiyang City and Hengyang City through the town.

Railway 
The Luoyang–Zhanjiang Railway, from Luoyang City, Henan Province to Zhanjiang City, Guangdong Province runs through the town.

Religion
Jinfeng Temple is a Buddhist temple on the top of Fusi Mountain. It was originally built in the Yuan dynasty (12711368) and later destroyed and rebuilt several times.

Jiandao Temple is also a Buddhist temple in the southwest of the town.

Attractions
There are local specialties including Ningxiang Pig, Castanea mollissima and kumquats.

References

External links

 

Divisions of Ningxiang
Ningxiang